Komak Wuacho is a populated place situated in Pima County, Arizona, United States. The name comes from the Tohono O'odham komadk weco, meaning "flats beneath".

References

Populated places in Pima County, Arizona